The Price of Death is a 1971 Italian Western film directed by  Lorenzo Gicca Palli and starring Klaus Kinski and Gianni Garko. Some DVD releases feature the title Der Galgen wartet schon, Amigo!.

Plot
Silver, who is elegantly dressed and lives in a hacienda with beautiful senoritas, is hired to find out if the accused Chester Conway, the black sheep of the town, really is guilty of the murder charge that he is to hang for. By investigating clues and arranging a trap, Silver discloses some respected citizens as the guilty parties. However, when Conway is released Silver shows that he had raped and killed a Mexican girl while the murder he was charged with took place, and he kills Conway in a duel.

Cast
 Gianni Garko as Silver
 Klaus Kinski as Chester Conway
 Gely Genka as Polly
 Franco Abbiana as Jeff Plummer
 Luciano Catenacci as Sheriff Tom Stanton
 Laura Gianoli as Polly's sister
 Giancarlo Prete as Reverend Adam Tiller
 Luigi Casellato as Abacuc Randall
 Luciano Pigozzi as Doctor Rosenthal
 Franca De Stratis as Carmen
 Andrea Scotti as the prosecutor's lawyer
 Alfredo Rizzo as Judge Atwell
 Giuseppe Castellano as Grant

Reception
In his investigation of narrative structures in Spaghetti Western films, Fridlund ranges The Price of Death among Spaghetti Westerns heavily influenced by secret-agent films, because the hero is shown in company with beautiful women and in luxurious surroundings, works to uncover a mystery and - unlike the protagonists in A Fistful of Dollars and Django -  does not have any complicating secondary motive.

Release
Wild East announced they would be releasing "The Price of Death" on DVD in a double feature with Killer Caliber 32. The release was canceled due to rights issues. Killer Caliber 32 is now scheduled to be released in a double feature with Killer Adios instead.

References

External links

1971 films
1971 Western (genre) films
1970s Italian-language films
Spaghetti Western films
1970s Italian films